Izalci Lucas Ferreira (born 7 April 1956) is a federal senator of Brazil, although born in Minas Gerais he represents the Federal District. He previously served in the legislature of federal deputies from 2008 to 2019.

Personal life
Lucas was born in Araújos, to Antonio Ferreira Neto and Maria Ferreira de Melo. Prior to becoming a politician, Lucas worked as a business contractor. Lucas is married to Ivone Fernandes and has two sons: Sérgio and Renato.

Political career
Lucas voted in favor of the impeachment motion of then-president Dilma Rousseff. Lucas voted against a similar corruption investigation into Rousseff's successor Michel Temer. He voted in favor of the 2017 Brazilian labor reforms.

In the 2018 Brazilian general election Lucas was elected to the federal senate with 399,297 votes.

During Operation Car Wash, Lucas was investigated on suspicion of financial fraud.

References

1956 births
Living people
People from Minas Gerais
Brazilian Social Democracy Party politicians
Democrats (Brazil) politicians
Members of the Federal Senate (Brazil)
Members of the Chamber of Deputies (Brazil) from the Federal District